Michael Fiebach (Mike Fiebach) is an American entrepreneur and businessman; he is the founder of Fame House, an e-commerce and digital marketing agency focused on the music industry with clients such as  Eminem,  Tiesto,  Pearl Jam,  Ice Cube, and  Amanda Palmer.  Fiebach sold Fame House to  SFX Entertainment in 2013 for an undisclosed sum. In May of 2016, Universal Music Group acquired Fame House from SFX, and Fiebach remained as the CEO. Fiebach worked for the electronic music producer DJ Shadow from 2006–2010, running his online operation and merchandise business. Fiebach wrote a series of blog entries for Hypebot.com about his experience touring with DJ Shadow in 2010.

Early life and education 
Fiebach attended Springside Chestnut Hill Academy in Philadelphia, college at San Francisco State University, and later attended Temple Law in Philadelphia.

Public appearances 
Michael has spoken at music and tech conferences including SXSW, Bandwidth, SF MusicTech, Digital Music Week, Philadelphia Music Startup Academy at Drexel University and Grammy futureNOW

Awards 
In 2016, Michael and Fame House were recognized as a Philadelphia Future 50 company by SmartCEO. These awards are given to the fastest-growing mid-sized companies in the region.

References 

Temple University Beasley School of Law alumni
San Francisco State University alumni
Living people
Year of birth missing (living people)